The 2016 NCAA Division I FCS football season, part of college football in the United States, was organized by the National Collegiate Athletic Association (NCAA) at the Division I Football Championship Subdivision (FCS) level. The NCAA Division I Football Championship Game was played on January 7, 2017, in Frisco, Texas. The James Madison Dukes defeated the Youngstown State Penguins, 28–14, to capture their second national championship in team history.

Rule changes
The following rule changes were voted on by the NCAA Football Rules Committee for the 2016 season:

 Requiring replay officials to review all aspects of targeting penalties, including the option to call a targeting foul missed by the on-field officials if the foul is deemed egregious.
 Allowing electronic devices to be used for coaching purposes in the press box and locker room during the game.  Electronic devices will still be prohibited on the field and sideline.
 Coaches can now be ejected after receiving two unsportsmanlike conduct penalties in one game, the same as players.
 A ball carrier who "gives himself up" (e.g., by sliding) will now be considered a defenseless player.
 Deliberate tripping of a ball carrier with the leg is now a penalty (15 yards for tripping).
 Players who leave the tackle box are now prohibited from blocking below the waist toward the initial position of the ball.
 An exception to a rule introduced for the 2015 season regarding low hits to passers (i.e., at or below the knee) was eliminated. Last season, a defensive player would not have been penalized for such a hit if making a bona fide attempt at a tackle, but will now be penalized in the same situation.
 Teams attempting a scrimmage kick (field goals/PATs/punts) must have five offensive linemen (numbered 50–79) on the scrimmage line unless the kicking team has at least two players seven yards OR one player at least 10 yards behind the line of scrimmage. Previously only one player had to be lined up seven yards behind the line to avoid using five linemen, causing confusion in kick coverage on defense.

The committee, once again, took no action on changing the ineligible receiver downfield rule from three yards to one yard; however it will once again be a "point of emphasis" and will adjust officiating mechanics to better officiate those plays.

In addition to the above changes, the NCAA approved an experimental rule on kickoffs and touchbacks to be used this season by the Ivy League in conference games only. In those games, kickoffs were taken from the 40-yard line instead of the 35, and touchbacks were brought back to the 20-yard line instead of the 25. The Ivies proposed the experiment in the interest of player safety, believing that increasing the frequency of touchbacks would reduce injury risk from kick returns. The Ivies were scheduled to report the results of the experiment to the NCAA in February 2017.

Conference changes and new programs

Membership changes

Note
Coastal Carolina began a two-year transition to FBS in 2016, playing as an FCS independent while housing most of its other sports in the FBS Sun Belt Conference. The Chanticleers will join Sun Belt football in 2017.

Other headlines 
 January 29 – East Tennessee State and Bristol Motor Speedway announced that the Buccaneers' September 17 home game against Western Carolina, which would be ETSU's first Southern Conference game after a 12-season absence, would be played at the NASCAR racetrack. The playing surface was a temporary fieldturf field installed for the Tennessee–Virginia Tech game held one week earlier.
 April 20 – The NCAA banned five schools from this year's postseason for failure to meet Academic Progress Rate criteria. They are Florida A&M, Howard, Morgan State, Savannah State and Southern.
 April 28 – Following the March 1 announcement by the Sun Belt Conference that it would not renew its football-only membership agreements with Idaho and New Mexico State when they expire at the end of the 2017 season, Idaho announced that it would return to FCS football in its all-sports league, the Big Sky Conference, in 2018. The Vandals will become the first team ever to voluntarily drop from FBS to FCS.
 September 13 – The Big South Conference and the Division I non-football ASUN Conference announce a football partnership. Under its terms, any current or future member of either conference, as long as it lies within the general geographic footprint of the two leagues, that adds football or upgrades from non-scholarship to scholarship football is automatically entitled to Big South football membership. At the time of agreement, ASUN member Kennesaw State was already a Big South football member, and three other all-sports members of the two leagues played non-scholarship FCS football in the Pioneer Football League.
 November 14 – The Big South announces that Campbell, a full conference member that plays football in the Pioneer League, will upgrade to scholarship football and become a football member in 2018.
 November 19 – Joe Thomas Sr., a 55-year-old walk-on at South Carolina State, appeared for one play in the first quarter of the Bulldogs' season finale against Savannah State, running for 3 yards. Although the NCAA does not keep statistics on player ages, the father of Green Bay Packers linebacker Joe Thomas Jr. is believed to be the oldest player ever to take the field in a Division I game.
 December 6 – The University of North Alabama, ASUN, and Big South announce that the Division II Lions will move to Division I and eventually to FCS football. North Alabama will join the ASUN as an all-sports member in 2018, with Big South football membership following in 2019. The Lions will not be eligible for the conference title or the FCS playoffs until the completion of their Division I transition in 2022.

Updated stadiums
  South Dakota State  debuted the Dana J. Dykhouse Stadium  which seats 19,340. The stadium was half finished for the 2015 season and finished in time for the  Luke Bryan concert on September 8, 2016, and the first football game the evening of September 10. 
 New Hampshire debuted a major renovation and expansion of the renamed Wildcat Stadium. The venue, previously with a capacity of 6,500, now seats slightly over 11,000.
 William & Mary also debuted a major renovation and expansion to its Zable Stadium, which the saw the addition of an upper deck and an increase in capacity to 12,259.
 Prairie View A&M started its home schedule on September 3, 2016 in the new on-campus 15,000 seat Panther Stadium against Texas Southern.

Two teams played their final season in their then-current venues:
 Abilene Christian left the off-campus Shotwell Stadium after this season for the new on-campus Wildcat Stadium.
 East Tennessee State left local high school venue Kermit Tipton Stadium for a new on-campus William B. Greene Jr. Stadium.

FCS team wins over FBS teams
(FCS rankings from the STATS poll)
September 2:
Albany 22, Buffalo 16
September 3:
#14 Eastern Washington 45, Washington State 42
#5 Northern Iowa 25, Iowa State 20
#4 Richmond 37, Virginia 20
September 10:
Eastern Illinois 21, Miami (OH) 17
#10 Illinois State 9, Northwestern 7
#23 North Carolina A&T 39, Kent State 36 4OT
September 17:
#1 North Dakota State 23, No. 13 (FBS) Iowa 21
 NDSU went to No. 13 FBS Ranked Iowa and became just the 4th FCS team to beat an AP ranked FBS team by beating the Hawkeyes on a game-winning field goal 23–21. This was Iowa's first loss to a non FBS opponent. The next day NDSU received 74 votes for the AP top-25 rankings (No. 27 overall), which is the most votes ever received by an FCS team, beating the old record held by North Dakota State in 2013 when they received 17 and were No. 33 after the 2013 season.
September 24:
Central Arkansas 28, Arkansas State 23
#13 Western Illinois 28, Northern Illinois 23

Conference standings

Conference summaries

Championship games

Other conference winners
Note: Records are regular-season only, and do not include playoff games.

Playoff qualifiers

Automatic berths for conference champions

At large qualifiers

Abstentions
Ivy League – Princeton
Mid-Eastern Athletic Conference – North Carolina Central
Southwestern Athletic Conference – Grambling State

NC Central and Grambling, as the winners of the MEAC and SWAC, will face off in the 2016 Celebration Bowl on December 17 for the unofficial HBCU national championship.

Postseason

NCAA Division I playoff bracket

* Home team    WinnerAll times in Eastern Standard Time (UTC−05:00)

Bowl games

Awards and honors

Walter Payton Award
The Walter Payton Award is given to the year's most outstanding offensive player. Finalists:
 Jeremiah Briscoe (QB), Sam Houston State
 Gage Gubrud (QB), Eastern Washington
 Cooper Kupp (WR), Eastern Washington

Buck Buchanan Award
The Buck Buchanan Award is given to the year's most outstanding defensive player. Finalists:
 Dylan Cole (LB), Missouri State
 P. J. Hall (DE), Sam Houston State
 Karter Schult (DE), Northern Iowa

Jerry Rice Award
The Jerry Rice Award is given to the year's most outstanding freshman.
 Winner: A. J. Hines (RB), Duquesne

Coaches
AFCA Coach of the Year: Mike Houston, James Madison
Eddie Robinson Award: K. C. Keeler, Sam Houston State

Coaching changes

In-season
This is restricted to coaching changes that took place on or after May 1, 2016. For coaching changes that occurred earlier in 2016, see 2015 NCAA Division I FCS end-of-season coaching changes.

End of season

See also
 2016 NCAA Division I FCS football rankings
 2016 NCAA Division I FBS football season
 2016 NCAA Division II football season
 2016 NCAA Division III football season
 2016 NAIA football season

References